Major General Luvuyo Nobanda  is a South African Army officer. He is the current Chief Director: Force Preparation and past General Officer Commanding (GOC) South African Army Engineer Formation.

Early life

Military career 

Gene Nobanda was in charge of the safety and security for Nelson Mandela's funeral.

Awards and decorations

Medals 
General Nobanda was awarded the following:

Other 
 
 Paratrooper's badge

References

South African Army generals
Living people
Year of birth missing (living people)
Military attachés